George Alexander Howe (born 1952) is a retired Anglican priest. He was Archdeacon of Westmorland and Furness from 2000 until 2011.

Howe was educated at Liverpool Institute, Durham University and Westcott House, Cambridge.

Howe was ordained in 1976. After curacies in Peterlee and Stockton-On-Tees he held incumbencies at Hart, Sedgefield, and Kendal before his time as Archdeacon; and Chief of Staff, Chaplain to  the James Newcome (the Bishop of Carlisle) and Diocesan Director of Ordinands afterwards.

Notes
 

 

1952 births
Clergy from Liverpool
Living people
People educated at Liverpool Institute High School for Boys
Alumni of St John's College, Durham
Alumni of Westcott House, Cambridge
Archdeacons of Westmorland and Furness